Fabricio Carvalho de Abreu (born October 21, 1990) is a Brazilian male acrobatic gymnast. Along with his partner, Yasmin Menezes, he competed in the 2014 Acrobatic Gymnastics World Championships.

References

1990 births
Living people
Brazilian acrobatic gymnasts
Male acrobatic gymnasts